Kenneth Goddard (1918 – 18 December 1978) was a Barbadian cricketer. He played in one first-class match for the Barbados cricket team in 1948/49.

See also
 List of Barbadian representative cricketers

References

External links
 

1918 births
1978 deaths
Barbadian cricketers
Barbados cricketers